The Gull Island, part of the Passage Group within the Furneaux Group, is an  granite island, located in Bass Strait southeast of Cape Barren Island, in Tasmania, in south-eastern Australia. The island is a conservation reserve and with the Passage and Forsyth islands, the Gull Island forms part of the Forsyth, Passage and Gull Islands Important Bird Area (IBA), identified as such by BirdLife International because it supports over 1% of the world populations of little penguins and black-faced cormorants.

Fauna
Recorded breeding seabird and wader species include little penguin, short-tailed shearwater, white-faced storm-petrel, Pacific gull, silver gull, sooty oystercatcher and crested tern.

See also

 List of islands of Tasmania

References

Furneaux Group
Protected areas of Tasmania
Important Bird Areas of Tasmania
Islands of Bass Strait
Islands of North East Tasmania